Mark Joseph Seitz (born January 10, 1954) is an American prelate of the Roman Catholic Church. He has been serving as the bishop of the Diocese of El Paso in Texas since July 9, 2013. He previously served as an auxiliary bishop of the Diocese of Dallas in Texas from 2010 to 2013.

Early life and education
Mark Seitz was born in Milwaukee, Wisconsin, on January 10, 1954, the eldest of ten siblings. In 1972, he entered Holy Trinity Seminary at the University of Dallas in Texas. He earned a Bachelor of Philosophy degree in 1976 and a Master of Divinity degree in 1980.

Ordination and ministry
Seitz was ordained to the priesthood for the Diocese of Dallas by Bishop Thomas A. Tschoepe on May 17, 1980. He served as a parochial vicar at Good Shepherd Church in Garland, Texas from 1980 to 1985. Seitz earned a Master of Theology degree from the University of Dallas in 1982 and a Master of Liturgical Studies degree from Saint John's University in Collegeville, Minnesota, in 1985. Seitz also took summer courses at the University of Notre Dame in Notre Dame, Indiana, and Duquesne University in Pittsburgh, Pennsylvania

Seitz served as an adjunct professor at the University of Dallas from 1985 to 1994, teaching liturgy and sacramental theology. He also served as associate spiritual director (1986-1987), director of liturgy (1986-1993), and vice-rector (1987-1993) at Holy Trinity Seminary. From 1993 to 2003, Seitz was pastor of St. Joseph Parish in Waxahachie, Texas. He was an instructor at the Christ the Servant Institute in Dallas in the fall of 2001 and interned at the National Catholic Bioethics Center in Philadelphia, Pennsylvania, during the fall of 2002. In 2003, Seitz became pastor of St. Rita's Parish in Dallas. He was named a prelate of honor by Pope John Paul II in December 2004. In 2009, Seitz donated one of his kidneys to an ailing parishioner. In 2010, he became pastor of All Saints Parish in Dallas.

Seitz was a member of the Presbyteral Council (1988–1993, 1999–2006, 2007–2010), spiritual director of Dallas/Fort Worth Courage (1998–2010), a member of the Diocesan Honduras Solidarity Team (2002–2010), a member of the College of Consultors of the diocese (2007–2010), spiritual director of the White Rose Women's Center in Dalla (2009–2010), and a board member s of the BirthChoice Catholic Crisis Pregnancy Center (2009-2010).

Auxiliary Bishop of Dallas

On March 11, 2010, Pope Benedict XVI appointed Seitz as an auxiliary bishop of the Diocese of Dallas with the titular see of Cozyla. He said: "I have learned through the years that following Christ is an adventure filled with totally unexpected dips and turns. When you give your life to His service you better learn to enjoy the ride." Seitz was one of the first auxiliary bishops of the Diocese of Dallas since its creation in 1969. Seitz received his episcopal consecration on the April 27, 2010, from Bishop Kevin Farrell, with Bishops Charles V. Grahmann and Michael Duca serving as co-consecrators.

Bishop of El Paso
On May 6, 2013, Pope Francis appointed Seitz as bishop of the Diocese of El Paso. He was installed there on July 9, 2013.On June 27, 2019, Seitz and several members of the Hope Border Institute of El Paso, Texas, escorted seven Central American asylum seekers to the Santa Fe International Bridge in Ciudad Juárez, Mexico to assist them in claiming asylum in the United States.

On July 18, 2017, Seitz issued a pastoral letter on immigration in which he said that "elected leaders have not yet mustered the moral courage to enact permanent, comprehensive immigration reform" and praised the efforts of the "heroic individuals, families, pastors, religious, parishes and institutions that spend themselves in service to migrants and refugees" and campaign "against the militarization of our border". He expressed concern for immigrant families who fear separation and for law enforcement officers who "put their lives on the line to stem the flow of weapons and drugs" but are "troubled in conscience by divisive political rhetoric and new edicts coming from Washington, D.C." He condemned profit-based immigrant detention centers, the hostility shown to asylum seekers, and "the disparagement of our Muslim brothers and sisters". 

In the aftermath of the El Paso Walmart shooting on August 3, 2019, Seitz wrote a pastoral letter on racism and white supremacy in which he wrote that,  "If we are honest, racism is really about advancing, shoring up, and failing to oppose a system of white privilege and advantage based on skin color. When this system begins to shape our public choices, structure our common life together and becomes a tool of class, this is rightly called institutionalized racism. Action to build this system of hate and inaction to oppose its dismantling are what we rightly call white supremacy. This is the evil one and the ‘father of lies’ (John 8:44) incarnate in our everyday choices and lifestyles, and our laws and institutions."  In February 2020,  Seitz, along with bishops from Texas, Arkansas, and Oklahoma, met with Pope Francis in Rome. The pope gave Seitz 50 rosaries that he personally blessed for survivors of the El Paso Walmart shooting.

See also

 Catholic Church hierarchy
 Catholic Church in the United States
 Historical list of the Catholic bishops of the United States
 List of Catholic bishops of the United States
 Lists of patriarchs, archbishops, and bishops

References

External links 
Roman Catholic Diocese of El Paso website
Catholic Hierarchy entry

Episcopal succession

1954 births
Living people
Religious leaders from Milwaukee
University of Dallas alumni
University of Notre Dame alumni
Duquesne University alumni
College of Saint Benedict and Saint John's University alumni
21st-century Roman Catholic bishops in the United States
Roman Catholic bishops of El Paso
Knights of the Holy Sepulchre